1984 Dakar Rally also known as the 1984 Paris–Dakar Rally was the 6th running of the Dakar Rally event. The course was extended through Ivory Coast, Guinea, Sierra Leone and Mauritania. 427 competitors started. René Metge and Dominique Lemoyne won the car class with a Porsche 953, which was often called the 911 SC/RS 4x4, and Gaston Rahier won the motorcycles class.

Final standings

Bikes

Cars

References

Dakar Rally
Paris
Paris
1984 in African sport